The Richmond Boys Choir (or RBC) is a boys' choir and non-profit organization in Richmond, Virginia. RBC is funded by donations, sponsorships and federal and state grants.

History
The Richmond Boys Choir was founded in 1996 in Richmond, Virginia, as a collaboration between Theatre IV and the Boys & Girls Club of Richmond. In the fall of 1996 the RBC conducted its first citywide auditions. As a result approximately 25 boys were chosen for membership. By 1997 RBC became an independent, non-profit 501(c)3. The choir was recognized in 2011 by the Virginia General Assembly as "Richmond's Ambassadors' of Song."

Performance awards

The choir passed its 20th season in 2016 and regularly performs in the community of Richmond and on tour throughout the United States. The choir has also appeared on the nationally syndicated program The Today Show. In 2007, the choir was named a finalist in the National Endowment for the Arts Coming Up Taller Awards. The August 2015 edition of Richmond Magazine names the Richmond Boys Choir the city's best youth choir.

External links
 
 WTVR 6 Performance

References

 

Boys' and men's choirs
Musical groups established in 1996
1996 establishments in Virginia
Men in the United States
Music of Richmond, Virginia
Choirs in Virginia